{{DISPLAYTITLE:C8H16N2O4}}
The molecular formula C8H16N2O4 (molar mass: 204.224 g/mol) may refer to:

 N(6)-Carboxymethyllysine
 Pentabamate

Molecular formulas